Coolidge High School is a high school in Coolidge, Arizona which was established in 1939, and was renovated in 2005. It is located at 684 W. Northern Ave. It is one of two high schools under the jurisdiction of the Coolidge Unified School District. Coolidge High School shares its campus with Coolidge Junior High School.

The original Coolidge High School built in 1939 and is located at 450 N. Arizona Blvd. The building now houses the offices of the Coolidge Unified School District #23.

Sports 
Coolidge has many various types of sports. The Coolidge Bears have had a long-standing rivalry between Florence Unified School Districts, Florence Gophers.

Fall
 Football [Male]
 Volleyball [Female]
 Cross Country [Male and Female]
 Swim [Male and Female]

Winter
 Basketball [Male and Female]
 Soccer [Male and Female]
 Wrestling [Male and Female]

Spring
 Boys' Baseball [Male]
 Girls' Softball [Female]
 Tennis [Male and Female]
 Track [Male and Female]

References

Public high schools in Arizona
Schools in Pinal County, Arizona
1939 establishments in Arizona